William Moffat (22 July 1858 – 30 July 1932) was an Australian cricketer. He played in one first-class match for South Australia in 1877/78.

See also
 List of South Australian representative cricketers

References

External links
 

1858 births
1932 deaths
Australian cricketers
South Australia cricketers